Sly Mongoose is the third science fiction novel of Caribbean writer Tobias S. Buckell. The novel is a standalone but is set in the same universe as Buckell's novels Crystal Rain and Ragamuffin. The novels are also linked by a recurring character. The book's title is taken from a Jamaican folk song of the same name.

2008 American novels
2008 science fiction novels
Novels by Tobias S. Buckell
Caribbean in fiction
Tor Books books